A corf is an underwater container used to hold live fish or crustaceans.

Corf may also refer to:
 Corf (mining), a basket or small wagon used for carrying coal
 Alternate (archaic) spelling of River Corve in Shropshire, England

CORF may refer to
 Commission for Organising the Fortified Regions (La Commission d'organisation des régions fortifiées), a French military organisation
 Combination of receptive fields, a computational model of a simple cell in the visual system
 Cutting off reflected failure CORF and CORFing, the opposite of basking in reflected glory